Bootleg is a 1985 Australian film directed by John Prescott and starring John Flaus as a detective in Queensland.

References

External links
 

Australian crime drama films
1985 films
1980s English-language films
1980s Australian films